Chromidina is a genus of apostome ciliates of the family Opalinopsidae. Species of Chromidina are parasitic  in the renal and pancreatic appendages of cephalopods.

In 2016, a molecular study found that the closest relatives of Chromidina spp. were species of the apostome Pseudocollinia.

References 

Oligohymenophorea
Ciliate genera